Khoy (Persian and ; ; ; also Romanized as Khoi), is a city in the Central District of Khoy County, West Azerbaijan province, Iran, and serves as capital of the county. At the 2006 census, its population was 178,708 in 45,090 households. The following census in 2011 counted 200,958 people in 57,149 households. The latest census in 2016 showed a population of 198,845 people in 59,964 households.

Khoy is located north of the province's capital and largest city Urmia, and 807 km north-west to Tehran. The region's economy is based on agriculture, particularly the production of fruit, grain, and timber. Khoy is nicknamed as the Sunflower city of Iran. At the 2006 census, the city had a population of 178,708, with an estimated 2012 population of 200,985. Khoy is largely populated by Azerbaijanians.Except for the residents of the western edge of Khoy, who are mostly Kurds; The majority of its population (more than 90%) are Shiites. The Kurds of this region, who live mostly in a nomadic way, are composed of two independent tribes, Küresünni and Madrumi.

Occupied since Median times, it shares a long history as an important Christian center.

History
Khoy was named in ancient times for the salt mines that made it an important spur of the Silk Route. 3000 years ago, a city existed on the area where Khoy is located nowadays, but its name became Khoy only in the 14th centuries ago. In 714 BC, Sargon II passed the region of which Khoy is part of in a campaign against Urartu.

During the reign of Greater Armenia this city was a part of Nor-Shirakan province (ashkar). Khoy was mentioned in VIII century AD and was called Her by Anania Shirakatsi in "Ashkharatsuyts".

In the Parthian period, Khoy was the gateway of the Parthian Empire in the Northwest. Around the year 37 BC, Mark Antony had crossed the plain that is located between Khoy and Marand during one of the many and frequent Roman-Parthian Wars.

Scholars such as Josef Markwart consider Khoy to be the identical to the Gobdi station mentioned in the Tabula Peutingeriana.

One of the important historic elements of the city is Surp Sarkis Church. Armenian documents wrote that the date of the making has to be either 332 or 333 AD. In the city and its surrounding villages, churches are seen and it is reported that Armenians have always been comprising a significant amount of the city’s population.

By the first half of the 11th century the Byzantine emperors were actively trying to round off their eastern territories, in an attempt to absorb the unstable Armenian dynasties. In 1021-2 emperor Basil II led his army as far as Khoy within 175 km of Dvin, and obtained the surrender of royalty from the Artsruni dynasty of Van.

In 1210, the city was conquered by the forces of Kingdom of Georgia sent by Tamar the Great under the command of Zakaria and Ivane Mkhargrdzeli. This was a response to the sacking of Georgian-controlled Ani which occurred in 1208 and left 12,000 Christians dead.

The city was ruled over by Malika, wife of Jalal al-Din Mangburni after his conquest of the city in the late 1220s.

Modern period

In the wake of the demise of the Safavids, the Ottomans took Khoy on 6 May 1724, a territorial gain which was confirmed with Imperial Russia through the Treaty of Constantinople (1724).

Until 1828, Khoy had a large number of Armenians; however, the Treaty of Turkmenchay (1828), gave the Russians the right to encourage Armenians to immigrate into the Russian Empire. Nevertheless, a small Armenian population remained living in Khoy. This was noted by an American missionary in 1834. He noted further that in the villages around Khoy there were a few more, but the vast majority had migrated to the North of the Aras river following Russia's victory over Persia in 1828 and the encouraged settling in the newly incorporated Russian regions of Eastern Armenia.

With the advent of the 1910s, Khoy was occupied by Ottoman troops, but they were completely expelled from the area by the Russians by 1911. Khoy was one of the many cities in Iran which garrisoned Russian infantry and Cossacks. The Russians retreated at the time of Enver Pasha's offensive in the Iran-Caucasus region, but returned in around early 1916, and stayed in the region up to the wake of the Russian Revolution. In 1918, for a final brief period, the Ottomans took Khoy until the decisive end of World War I and the Armistice of Mudros. In World War II, Khoy was again occupied by Soviet troops, who remained until 1946. After 1946 the city indefinitely became part of Iran and is located in the far northwest of the country. Today the city is populated by Azerbaijanis and Kurds.

Climate
Köppen-Geiger climate classification system classifies its climate as cold semi-arid (BSk).>

Sights
Khoy is well known for the tomb of Shams Tabrizi, renowned Iranian poet and mystic.

Famous places
 Tomb of Shams Tabrizi, Shams Tabrizi Tower
 Bastam and Bolourabad Castles
 Khatoon Bridge
 Old Stone Gate 
 Old Bazaar 
 Motallebkhan Mosque
 Mount Avrin
 Ghotour Iron Bridge
 Surp Sarkis Church
 Pourya-ye Vali

Notable natives
For a complete list see: :Category:People from Khoy

Twin towns
  Konya, Turkey (since 2011)

See also

 Donboli (tribe)
 Khoy Khanate
 Nor Shirakan

References

Sources

External links

The first portal fun of recreational and cultural city of Khoy
Official website of Khoyee people's assembly
Khoy government
Khoy Municipality
Nima Language Center
Khoy journal

Khoy County

Populated places in West Azerbaijan Province

Populated places in Khoy County

Cities in West Azerbaijan Province

Mass murder in 1918